Thomas Carothers (born June 28, 1956) is an American lawyer and an expert on international democracy support, democratization, and U.S. foreign policy. He is a senior fellow at the Carnegie Endowment for International Peace, where he founded and currently co-directs the Democracy, Conflict, and Governance Program. He has also taught at several universities in the United States and Europe, including Central European University, the Johns Hopkins School of Advanced International Studies, and Nuffield College, Oxford. 

Carothers has served in various senior management positions at the Carnegie Endowment, including as the interim president of the Endowment in 2021, and as senior vice president for studies for many years.

Early life
Carothers received a J.D. from Harvard Law School, a M.Sc. from the London School of Economics where he was a Marshall Scholar and an A.B. summa cum laude from Harvard College. He speaks English, French, and Spanish.

Career
Prior to joining the Carnegie Endowment in 1993, Carothers worked at the law firm of Arnold & Porter in Washington, DC. Before that, he was an attorney-adviser at the Office of the Legal Adviser of the U.S. Department of State from 1985 to 1988. While serving at the State Department, he worked with the United States Agency for International Development (USAID) on democracy assistance in Latin America. This experience formed the basis for his first book, In the Name of Democracy: U.S. Policy Toward Latin America in the Reagan Years.

His work has focused on international democracy support, including civil society development, political party assistance, rule of law assistance, and democratic transitions. In addition to his research and writings, Carothers has consulted for and worked directly on democracy assistance programs for both private and public aid organizations.

Carothers is the author of five books on international democracy and development assistance, as well as three edited volumes and a collection of his most influential essays. He has also written numerous articles for the Journal of Democracy, Foreign Affairs, Foreign Policy, and other publications. His writings have been translated into many languages.

Bibliography

Books
 Democracies Divided:  The Global Challenge of Political Polarization (co-edited with Andrew O’Donohue), Brookings Press, 2019.Development Aid Confronts Politics: The Almost Revolution (with Diane de Gramont), Carnegie Endowment for International Peace, 2013.
 Confronting the Weakest Link: Aiding Political Parties in New Democracies, Carnegie Endowment for International Peace, 2006.
 Promoting the Rule of Law Abroad: In Search of Knowledge (editor), Carnegie Endowment for International Peace, 2006.
 Uncharted Journey: Promoting Democracy in the Middle East (co-edited with Marina Ottaway). Carnegie Endowment for International Peace, 2005.
 Critical Mission: Essays on Democracy Promotion, Carnegie Endowment for International Peace, 2004.
 Funding Virtue: Civil Society Aid and Democracy Promotion (co-edited with Marina Ottaway), Carnegie Endowment for International Peace, 2000.
 Aiding Democracy Abroad: The Learning Curve, Carnegie Endowment for International Peace, 1999.
 Assessing Democracy Assistance: The Case of Romania, Carnegie Endowment for International Peace, 1996.
 In the Name of Democracy: U.S. Policy Toward Latin America in the Reagan Years, University of California Press, 1993.

Selected essays
 Democracy Aid at 25: Time to Choose, Journal of Democracy, vol. 26, no. 1, January 2015.
 Accountability, Transparency, Participation, and Inclusion: A New Development Consensus? (with Saskia Brechenmacher), Carnegie Paper, October 2014.
 Closing Space: Democracy and Human Rights Support Under Fire (with Saskia Brechenmacher), Carnegie Report, February 2014.
 Democracy Policy Under Obama: Revitalization or Retreat?, Carnegie Report, January 2012.
 Aiding Governance in Developing Countries: Progress Amid Uncertainties (with Diane de Gramont), Carnegie Paper, November 2011.
 Looking for Help: Will Rising Democracies Become International Democracy Supporters? (with Richard Youngs), Carnegie Paper, July 2011.
 Think Again: Arab Democracy, Foreign Policy, March 10, 2011.
 The Elusive Synthesis, Journal of Democracy, vol. 21, no 4, October 2010.
 Revitalizing Democracy Assistance: The Challenge of USAID, Carnegie Report, October 2009.	
 Stepping Back From Democratic Pessimism, Carnegie Paper no. 99, February 2009.	
 Democracy Assistance: Political vs. Developmental, Journal of Democracy, vol. 20, no 1, January 2009. 	
 The Sequencing Fallacy, Journal of Democracy, vol. 18, no 1, January 2007. 	
 The Backlash Against Democracy Promotion, Foreign Affairs, March/April 2006.
 The End of the Transition Paradigm, Journal of Democracy, vol. 13, no 1, January 2002.

References

External links 

  Official Biography at the Carnegie Endowment for International Peace 
 Website of the Carnegie Democracy and Rule of Law Program 
 

American political scientists
American foreign policy writers
American male non-fiction writers
Harvard College alumni
Alumni of the London School of Economics
Living people
1956 births
Marshall Scholars
Harvard Law School alumni
Arnold & Porter people